In mathematics, Mahler's theorem, introduced by , expresses continuous p-adic functions in terms of polynomials. Over any field of characteristic 0, one has the following result:

Let  be the forward difference operator.  Then for polynomial functions f we have the Newton series

where

is the kth binomial coefficient polynomial.

Over the field of real numbers, the assumption that the function f is a polynomial can be weakened, but it cannot be weakened all the way down to mere continuity. Mahler's theorem states that if f is a continuous p-adic-valued function on the p-adic integers then the same identity holds. The relationship between the operator Δ and this polynomial sequence is much like that between differentiation and the sequence whose kth term is xk.

It is remarkable that as weak an assumption as continuity is enough; by contrast, Newton series on the field of complex numbers are far more tightly constrained, and require Carlson's theorem to hold.

References

Factorial and binomial topics
Theorems in analysis